Otto Moritz David Goldschmidt (21 August 1829 – 24 February 1907) was a German composer, conductor and pianist, known for his piano concertos and other piano pieces.  He married the "Swedish Nightingale", soprano Jenny Lind.

Life
Goldschmidt was born in Hamburg, Germany, and his parents were salesman Moritz David Goldschmidt and women's rights activist Johanna Goldschmidt. He had seven siblings, and his wealthy and well-educated parents belonged to the community of liberal Reform Jews in Germany. Since his mother was musically gifted – an excellent singer, pianist, violinist and harpist – she focused on the musical education of her children. Goldschmidt attended the Conservatory in Leipzig from 1843 to 1846 where he studied under Felix Mendelssohn and Moritz Hauptmann. From Mendelssohn, Goldschmidt received this student certificate: "Mr. Goldschmidt has developed a fine talent for piano playing in gratifying manner and also has shown not insignificant talent in composition for his instrument."  Additionally, he took private piano lessons with Frédéric Chopin in Paris in 1848 and Clara Schumann.

On 5 February 1852, Goldschmidt married the world-famous soprano Jenny Lind in Boston, Massachusetts.  To please his wife, he converted to become Episcopalian. They had three children. From 1858, they lived in London where Otto became a professor in 1863 and later vocal director at the Royal Academy of Music. He was made an honorary member of the London Philharmonic Society in 1861. In 1863, Goldschmidt and William Sterndale Bennett compiled the Chorale Book of England.  In 1876, he founded the Bach Choir, which he led until 1886. He several times conducted the famous Lower Rhine festivals at Düsseldorf.

After the death of his wife in 1887, Goldschmidt released her biography Jenny Lind. Ihre Laufbahn als Künstlerin (Jenny Lind: Her Career as an Artist).

Goldschmidt died in London in 1907 at the age of 77.

Works
Goldschmidt wrote  a piano concerto, and other piano pieces, songs and trios. In his oratorio Ruth, his wife sang the soprano part at the 1870 premiere, the last performance of her career.

Notes

Sources
 German Wikipedia article

External links
 
 

1829 births
1907 deaths
German classical composers
German conductors (music)
German male conductors (music)
German classical pianists
Male classical pianists
Honorary Members of the Royal Philharmonic Society
19th-century German Jews
Musicians from Hamburg
German male classical composers
19th-century classical pianists
19th-century German musicians
German pianists
German male pianists
19th-century German male musicians
German emigrants to the United Kingdom